"Getting Over You" is a song written by Tony Hazzard in 1973, and recorded by various artists, including the writer. Hazzard's original is from his LP 'Was That Alright Then?' and was included on his double album 'Go North - The Bronze Anthology'.

Peter Noone cover
A version by Herman's Hermits lead singer Peter Noone charted in Canada, a track from his 1973 eponymous debut LP. The song reached #63 on the Adult Contemporary chart.

Andy Williams version
Andy Williams recorded the most successful version of the song, entitled simply as "Getting Over You".  It is a track from his Solitaire album.

"Getting Over You" reached #35 in the UK during the late spring of 1974.  The single was released from Williams' Solitaire LP. In the U.S., the song was featured as the B-side of "Remember," which was a hit for Williams on the Easy Listening chart.

Chart history
Peter Noone

Andy Williams

Other versions
Caterina Caselli covered the song in Italian in 1974 from her Primavera album.

References

External links
 

1973 songs
1974 singles
Songs written by Tony Hazzard
Andy Williams songs
Peter Noone songs
Caterina Caselli songs
Columbia Records singles
Philips Records singles
Song recordings produced by Richard Perry
Song recordings produced by Dick Glasser